Sarem (also Romanized as Sārem) is a village in Siyarastaq Yeylaq Rural District, Rahimabad District, Rudsar County, Gilan Province, Iran. At the 2006 census, its population was 51, in 18 families.

References 

Populated places in Rudsar County